Fiães is a Portuguese parish, located in the municipality of Melgaço. The population in 2011 was 239, in an area of 11.21 km2.

References

Freguesias of Melgaço, Portugal